The 1998 Dallas Burn season was the third season of the Major League Soccer team. The team made the playoffs for the third consecutive year.

Final standings

Western Conference

Overall table

Regular season

Playoffs

Western Conference semifinals

U.S. Open Cup

References

External links
 Season statistics

1998
Dallas Burn
Dallas Burn
Dallas Burn